Richelle Stephens (born July 22, 1996) is an American rugby sevens player. She won a silver medal at the 2015 Pan American Games as a member of the United States women's national rugby sevens team.

References

External links 
 

1996 births
Living people
United States international rugby sevens players
Female rugby sevens players
American female rugby sevens players
Rugby sevens players at the 2015 Pan American Games
Pan American Games silver medalists for the United States
Rugby sevens players at the 2016 Summer Olympics
Olympic rugby sevens players of the United States
Rugby sevens players at the 2014 Summer Youth Olympics
Pan American Games medalists in rugby sevens
Lindenwood University alumni
Medalists at the 2015 Pan American Games